The 1989 Ohio State Buckeyes football team represented the Ohio State University in the 1989 NCAA Division I-A football season. The Buckeyes compiled an 8–4 record, including the 1990 Hall of Fame Bowl in Tampa, Florida, where they lost, 31–14, to the Auburn Tigers. Their biggest highlight was their game against Minnesota, in which they trailed 31-0, but came back to stun the Gophers 41-37. This tied the record for the largest comeback win in college football history at the time. It still stands as the biggest comeback win in school history.

Schedule

Personnel

Season summary

Oklahoma State

at USC

Boston College

Carlos Snow 23 rushes, 147 yards

at Illinois

Indiana

Scottie Graham 16 rushes, 124 yards

Purdue

at Minnesota

at Northwestern

Scottie Graham 17 Rush, 102 Yds
Carlos Snow 17 Rush, 100 Yds

Iowa

Wisconsin

at Michigan

Hall of Fame Bowl (vs Auburn)

Draft picks

References

Ohio State
Ohio State Buckeyes football seasons
Ohio State Buckeyes football